Casalzuigno is a comune (municipality) in the Province of Varese in the Italian region Lombardy, located about  northwest of Milan and about  northwest of Varese.

Casalzuigno includes the Villa Della Porta Bozzolo, a 16th-century  villa belonging to the Fondo per l'Ambiente Italiano, donated by the heirs of the Italian senator and pathologist Camillo Bozzolo.

Arcumeggia, a frazione of the municipality of Casalzuigno has, on the external walls of the houses, some paintings, performed with the technique of the fresco, by Italian artists of the 20th century.

Casalzuigno borders the following municipalities: Azzio, Brenta, Castelveccana, Cuveglio, Cuvio, Duno, Porto Valtravaglia.

References

Cities and towns in Lombardy